Simone Bolelli was the defending champion, but decided to play in the 2015 ABN AMRO World Tennis Tournament instead.

Benoît Paire won the title defeating Aleksandr Nedovyesov in the final, 6–3, 7–6(7–3).

Seeds

Draw

Finals

Top half

Bottom half

References
 Main Draw
 Qualifying Draw

Trofeo Faip-Perrel - Singles
2015 Singles